"Bubblegum" is a song by American singer and songwriter Jason Derulo, from his fourth studio album, Tattoos (2014). The song features American rapper Tyga.

Music video
On August 27, 2014 Derulo uploaded the song's lyric video on his YouTube account.

Charts

References

Jason Derulo songs
Tyga songs
Song recordings produced by Timbaland
2014 songs
Songs written by Jason Derulo
Songs written by Tyga
Songs written by Timbaland
Songs written by Jim Beanz